Jeondeungsa (hangul: 전등사, hanja: 傳燈寺, McCune–Reischauer: Chŏndŭngsa) is a Buddhist temple located in Ganghwa-gun, Incheon, South Korea.

Templestay program 
Jeondeungsa offers Templestay programs for visitors where visitors can experience Buddhist culture.

Gallery

References

External links 
 Jeondeungsa temple official website

Buddhist temples in South Korea